Melicope fatuhivensis is a species of plant in the family Rutaceae. It is endemic to French Polynesia.

References

fatuhivensis
Flora of French Polynesia
Critically endangered flora of Oceania
Taxonomy articles created by Polbot